gener8tor is an American startup accelerator that operates in several US cities, including Madison, Milwaukee, and Minneapolis. As of March 2017, gener8tor was ranked as the top 11th startup accelerator out of more than 150 accelerator programs in the United States by the Seed Accelerator Rankings Project.

Since its inception, gener8tor has invested in 180 companies, which have gone on to raise more than $1 billion in total follow-on financing.

Program 
gener8tor runs 3 classes a year and accepts only 5 startups per class. The startups receive a hands-on mentorship, and up to $100,000 of investment. gener8tor offers $20,000 in exchange for 6-7% of equity and another $80,000 in the form of an uncapped convertible note. gener8tor takes no board seats, no preferred shares, and no liquidation preferences.

Each class happens in a different city, with Madison in the Spring, Minneapolis in the Summer, and Milwaukee during the Fall. Each class lasts about 3 months.

gener8tor invests in high-growth startups, including software, IT, web, SaaS, e-commerce and hardware.

Acceptance 
In its Madison 2017 class, gener8tor accepted 5 out of 691 companies.

In its inaugural Minneapolis 2017 class, gener8tor accepted 5 out of 456 companies.

Past rankings 
In March 2016, the Seed Accelerator Rankings Project ranked Gener8tor as the top 14th accelerator program in the United States out of 150 startup accelerators reviewed.

In March 2015, the Seed Accelerator Rankings Project ranked Gener8tor as the top 13th accelerator program out of 150 startup accelerators in the United States.

In March 2014, the Seed Accelerator Rankings Project placed Gener8tor in the top 20 of accelerator programs out of 150 participants whose programs were reviewed.

History
gener8tor's first fund was backed by Dan Armbrust, founder of Granite Microsystems, a Mequon, Wisconsin equipment manufacturer, and Dan Bader, president and CEO of Bader Philanthropies.

Gener8tor Fund II
CSA Partners Venture Management, a venture capital fund backed by Chris Abele, Milwaukee County Executive, and former president and CEO of the Argosy Foundation, Wisconsin Investment Partners, and other individual investors contributed 2.1 million dollars to "Gener8tor Fund II". The funds are for operations and investments of the gener8tor companies.

References

External links
 http://www.gener8tor.com/
https://www.gBETAstartups.com
https://www.onrampconference.com/
https://www.NMotion.co/
 http://www.seed-db.com/accelerators/view?acceleratorid=263012

Financial services companies established in 2012
Organizations based in Milwaukee
Technology companies established in 2012
2012 establishments in Wisconsin
Venture capital firms of the United States
Organizations based in Madison, Wisconsin
Startup accelerators